Fladmark is a Norwegian surname. Notable people with the surname include:

Helene Falch Fladmark (born 1966), Norwegian politician
Oscar Randolph Fladmark (1922–1955), American fighter pilot
Sture Fladmark (born 1967), Norwegian footballer and manager

Norwegian-language surnames